Ramona Singer ( Mazur; born November 18, 1956) is an American television personality, businesswoman, and author. She is best known as a main cast member on the reality television series The Real Housewives of New York City, in which she has starred in the first 13 seasons from 2008 to 2021.

Career 
Singer studied marketing at the Fashion Institute of Technology, where she was the first female graduate of the four-year honor program. After graduating college, Singer took part in a traineeship program at Macy's and later became a buyer for the department store chain. She also worked in sales management for the fashion companies Calvin Klein and French Connection. In 1986, Singer started her own wholesale clothing business RMS Fashions, Inc. Together with her former husband Mario Singer, she founded a jewelry company named True Faith Jewelry in 2005. 

Singer joined as a cast member on the first season of Bravo's television show The Real Housewives of New York City. As of 2021, she continued to be one of the series' main cast members after 13 seasons. As of 2023, the series is currently being rebooted, with a brand new cast joining the show, and the entire removal of the thirteenth season cast not returning.

Between 2009 and 2010, Singer sold two jewelry collections on the HSN. In 2010, she also launched the skincare line Tru Renewal, which she relaunched as Ageless by Ramona in 2018. In 2011, Singer brought a pinot grigio brand on the market (Ramona Pinot Grigio).

Singer's memoir Life on the Ramona Coaster was published in 2015 by Post Hill Press. The title of her book was a quote from past RHONY cast-mate, Bethenny Frankel. 

As of 2018, Singer rents out her Southampton mansion for $165,000 per month.

References 

Living people
1956 births
American jewelry designers
American socialites
American women company founders
Fashion Institute of Technology alumni
The Real Housewives cast members
Women jewellers